William B. Breuer (September 17, 1922 – August 18, 2010) was a soldier, journalist and American military historian, who specialized in the World War II epoch.

Legacy
His work, The Great Raid on Cabanatuan along with Hampton Sides' Ghost Soldiers, was adapted into a film titled The Great Raid (2005).

Bibliography
Agony at Anzio
The Air-raid Warden Was a Spy: and Other Tales from Home-front America in World War II. Hoboken, NJ: Wiley, 2003. 
An American Saga
Bizarre tales from World War II.  Edison, NJ: Castle Books, 2005, c1999.  
Bloody Clash at Sadzot: Hitler's Final Strike for Antwerp.  New York: Jove, 1981.  
Captain Cool
Daring Missions of World War II,  2002. 
Death of a Nazi Army: the Falaise Pocket. New York: Stein and Day, 1985.  
Devil Boats: the PT War against Japan.  Novato, CA: Presidio, 1987.  
Drop Zone, Sicily: Allied Airborne Strike, July 1943.  Novato, CA: Presidio, 1983. 
Feuding Allies: the Private Wars of the High Command. New York: John Wiley & Sons, 1995. 
Geronimo!: American paratroopers in World War II .  New York: St. Martin's, 1989.   
Guts!: 27 Courageous People and Their Triumphs Over Adversity. New Horizon Press, 2005.  
The Great Raid on Cabanatuan: Rescuing the Doomed Ghosts of Bataan and Corregidor. Wiley, 1994. 
Hitler's Fortress Cherbourg: the conquest of a bastion. New York: Stein and Day, 1984.  
Hitler's Undercover War: the Nazi Espionage Invasion of the U.S.A.  New York: St. Martin's, 1989. 
Hoodwinking Hitler
J. Edgar Hoover and His G-Men
MacArthur's Undercover War: Spies, Saboteurs, Guerrillas, and Secret Missions. 
Nazi Spies in America
Operation Dragoon: the Allied Invasion of the South of France. Novato, CA: Presidio, 1987.  
Operation Torch: The Allied Gamble to Invade North Africa.
Race to the Moon: America's Duel with the Soviets.  Praeger, 1993. 
Retaking the Philippines: America's Return to Corregidor and Bataan, October 1944-March 1945. New York: St. Martin's Press, 1986.  
Sea Wolf: a Biography of John D. Bulkeley, USN.  Novato, CA: Presidio, 1989.   
The Secret War with Germany: Deception, Espionage, and Dirty Tricks, 1939-1945.  New York: Jove Books, 1989, c1988.  
Secret Weapons of World War II
Shadow Warriors: the Covert War in Korea.  New York: John Wiley & Sons, 1996.  
Storming Hitler’s Rhine: the Allied Assault, February–March 1945. New York: St. Martin's Press, 1985.  
They Jumped at Midnight
Top Secret Tales of World War II
Undercover Tales of World War II
Unexplained Mysteries of World War II
Vendetta: Castro and the Kennedy Brothers
War and American Women: Heroism, Deeds, and Controversy.  Praeger, 1997.

References

External links
 Military historian William Breuer dies at 87
 In Memory of William B. Breuer

1922 births
2010 deaths
American military historians
American male non-fiction writers
Place of birth missing